, was a poet during the Taishō and Shōwa periods of Japan. He was born in Maebashi city Gunma Prefecture.

1893 births
1965 deaths
People from Maebashi
20th-century Japanese poets
Writers from Gunma Prefecture